Julius Jakob Freiherr von Haynau (14 October 1786 – 14 March 1853) was an Austrian general who suppressed insurrectionary movements in Italy and Hungary in 1848 and later. While a hugely effective military leader, he also gained renown as an aggressive and ruthless commander. His soldiers called him the "Habsburg Tiger"; those opponents who suffered from his brutality called him the "Hyena of Brescia" and the "Hangman of Arad".

Early life and education

Born in Kassel, Julius Jacob von Haynau was the illegitimate son of Rosa Dorothea Ritter, and William I (1743-1821), the landgrave (later elector) of Hesse-Kassel. He was born after his father's return with his wife and family to Hesse-Kassel after 20 years in Denmark. His father acknowledged this natural son, providing for his education and entry into the military officer corps as a cadet. In 1800, Julius Jacob and his siblings were granted the title of Freiherren/Freiinnen von Haynau.

Marriage and family
After several years of service in the Army, at nearly 22 years of age, on 11 October 1808 Haynau married Thérèse von Weber. She was the daughter of Field Marshal Lieutenant von Weber. Her father was killed in action the next year at the Battle of Aspern-Essling during the Napoleonic Wars.

Julius and Thérèse had more than four decades of marriage together before her death in 1850. She was survived by her husband and only daughter, Clotilde (27 September 1809 – 25 November 1897).

Military career
In 1801, Haynau entered the Austrian army as an infantry officer cadet at the age of 15. He gained extensive experience as a soldier during the Napoleonic Wars. He was wounded at Wagram in 1809, which the French won in one of their most important battles of the wars.

Haynau later distinguished himself during the Austrian operations in Italy in 1813 and 1814. 
Between 1815 and 1847, Haynau was promoted several times, reaching the rank of field marshal lieutenant.

Role in the revolutions

Haynau was said to have a violent temper, which led him into trouble with his superiors. His support for the monarchy led him to fiercely oppose the revolutionary movements of the mid-nineteenth century.

When the revolutionary insurrections of 1848 broke out in Italy, Haynau was selected to command troops to suppress them. He fought with success in Italy. He became known in this period for the severity with which he suppressed an uprising in Brescia and punished participants. A mob in Brescia had massacred invalid Austrian soldiers in the hospital, and von Haynau ordered reprisals. Numerous attackers were executed.

In June 1849, Haynau was called to Vienna to command a reserve army; he was ordered into the field against the Hungarians during their revolution and finally managed to defeat it with the help of an overwhelming Russian interventionist force, proving an effective but ruthless leader. His aggressive strategy may have partly been motivated by his wish to make Austria, rather than Russia, appear as the main victor of the war. Indeed, the general questioned the wisdom of inviting the Russians to intervene, as he considered that Austria, with reinforcements from Italy, could have won the war on its own. 

In Hungary as in Italy, Haynau was accused of brutality. For instance, he was said to have ordered women whipped who were suspected of sympathizing with the insurgents. He also ordered the execution by hanging of the 13 Hungarian rebel generals at Arad on 6 October 1849.

Opponents called him the "Hyena of Brescia" and "Hangman of Arad". In admiration, Austrian soldiers referred to him as the "Habsburg Tiger".

Later years

Upon the restoration of peace, Haynau was appointed to high command in Hungary. His temper quickly led him into quarrels with the minister of war, and he resigned his command in 1850. In later years, he travelled abroad, including to western Europe and England.

His reputation for brutality had spread throughout western Europe. In Brussels, Haynau narrowly escaped mob violence. In London, he was attacked by some draymen from the Barclay & Perkins brewery who threw mud and dung at him and chased him down the Borough High Street, shouting "Down with the Austrian butcher!". When the Italian revolutionary, Giuseppe Garibaldi, visited England in 1864, he insisted on visiting the brewery to thank the draymen.

Haynau is buried in St. Leonhard Cemetery in Graz, Austria.

References in popular culture
In 1862, during the American Civil War, the Union General Benjamin Butler commanded federal forces occupying New Orleans, Louisiana. They struggled with daily insults from the residents. He ordered that women showing disrespect toward the Union officers were to be treated as common prostitutes. The Confederate General P. G. T. Beauregard referred to Butler as "the Haynau of the North" for his order. Beauregard did not explain his allusion, believing that his officers were familiar with Haynau's reputation.

G. K. Chesterton, the English author, later described the event near the Barclay & Perkins brewery in London in his book The Crimes of England (1916), published during the First World War while Britain and Ireland were at war with Germany: 

When an Austrian general who had flogged women in the conquered provinces appeared in the London streets, some common draymen off a cart behaved with the direct quixotry of Sir Lancelot or Sir Galahad. He had beaten women and they beat him. They regarded themselves simply as avengers of ladies in distress, breaking the bloody whip of a German bully. 

A fictional portrayal of von Haynau appears in the 2022 novel, Assassin's Creed The Engine of History: The Magus Conspiracy, written by Kate Heartfield.

Honours
He received the following orders and decorations:

References 

 Nobili, Johann. Hungary 1848: The Winter Campaign. Edited and translated Christopher Pringle. Warwick, UK: Helion & Company Ltd., 2021.
 
 

1786 births
1853 deaths
Military personnel from Kassel
Barons of Austria
19th-century German military personnel
Austrian military personnel of the Italian Independence Wars
People of the Revolutions of 1848
Hungarian Revolution of 1848
19th-century Austrian military personnel
Austrian Empire military personnel of the Napoleonic Wars
People of the First Italian War of Independence
Grand Crosses of the Military Order of Maria Theresa
Grand Crosses of the Order of Saint Stephen of Hungary
Grand Crosses of the Military Order of Max Joseph
Recipients of the Order of St. George of the Fourth Degree
Recipients of the Order of St. Anna, 3rd class
Recipients of the Order of the White Eagle (Russia)
Sons of monarchs